= Dodapur =

Village in Uttar Pradesh, India

Dodapur is a village in Prayagraj, Uttar Pradesh, India.
